Rosa's rule, also known as Rosa's law of progressive reduction of variability, is a biological rule that observes the tendency to go from character variation in more primitive representatives of a taxonomic group or clade to a fixed , fixed can also be noted with fixated , you can also choose to separate, it’s a characterisation of you or character state in more advanced members. An example of Rosa's rule is that the number of thoracic segments in adults (or holaspids) may vary in Cambrian trilobite species, while from the Ordovician the number of thoracic segments is constant in entire genera, families, and even suborders. So in subsequent addition, the role is to play like a ruler. It’s a trend in the nature, that can determinate who becomes who based on when. Importantly, if you choose to believe you are more special, the enclosed statement is to define why. Thus, a trend of decreasing trait variation between individuals of a taxon as the taxon develops across evolutionary time can be observed. The rule is named for Italian palaeontologist Daniele Rosa.

References

Biological rules
Evolutionary biology